Richard H. Finan (born August 16, 1934) is an American Republican politician who formerly served in the Ohio General Assembly.  An attorney, Finan was initially elected to the Ohio House of Representatives in 1972, representing a suburban Cincinnati district.  He was easily reelected in 1974 and 1976.

In 1978, Senator Michael Maloney left the Ohio Senate to become Hamilton County Administrator.  As a result, his Senate seat became open, and Finan was appointed by Senate Republicans to succeed him.  He ran for election to a full term that November, and won. He was reelected in 1982, and went on to serve as Chairman of the Senate Ways and Means Committee. He was reelected again in 1986. In 1990, Finan was thought to be aiming for a run for Ohio Governor. However, he remained in the Senate and won a fifth term in the fall election of that year. By this time, he was serving as President pro tempore of the Senate.

When Senate President Stanley Aronoff decided not to seek reelection in 1996, Finan was nominated to replace him.  With term limits now in effect in Ohio, Finan was only eligible for one final term, and won in 1998. After twenty four years in office, Finan left the Senate in 2002.

Since leaving the Senate, Finan has returned to private practice and lobbying.

Finan was elected Mayor of his hometown, the Village of Evendale, in 2015 and again in 2019

References

External links

Republican Party Ohio state senators
Politicians from Cincinnati
Republican Party members of the Ohio House of Representatives
Living people
1934 births
21st-century American politicians
Presidents of the Ohio State Senate